Laran-e Sofla (also Romanized as Lārān-e Soflá) is a village in Shiveh Sar Rural District, Bayangan District, Paveh County, Kermanshah Province, Iran. At the 2006 census, its population was 175, in 41 families.

References 

Populated places in Paveh County